Veliki Brat 2007 is the second season of the television reality show Veliki Brat, the Serbian, Bosnian and Montenegrin joint version of Big Brother.

The second season started on 22 September 2007 and was supposed to run until its scheduled finale on 5 January 2008, however, immediately following the death of three of the evicted housemates—Stevan Zečević, Zorica Lazić and Elmir Kuduzović, the producers of the show, Emotion and B92, decided to stop that season's broadcast on 29 December 2007, a week before the planned finale.

At 9:00 pm on 29 December, the TV audience was informed about the stoppage of broadcasts effective immediately. It was announced that all of the remaining housemates (7 of them) had left the Veliki Brat House during the afternoon and that the prize money would be split among them. After the statement, archive footage of the three deceased former housemates was shown.

There were no statements on what would be done with the amount of €20,000 earned by two housemates as a part of their on-air secret tasks. This amount was supposed to be given as a humanitarian donation to charity organizations or individuals in need.

Car accident

On 28 December 2007, Stevan Zečević, Zorica Lazić and Elmir Kuduzović, who had all been evicted earlier in the season, were killed in a car crash. The crash occurred when their Citroën C4, driven by Kuduzović, ran off the road near the town of Ušće, Serbia. The car reportedly skidded off the road due to excessive speed on a turn, flipped onto its roof and landed in the Vukodraž River. The crash happened on Obrenovac-Šabac road, which was icy at the time. A fourth person in the car, Vladimir Sarić, who was not a member of this season's cast, was injured in the crash. Another car carrying fellow evicted housemates, Tanja Obradović and Jelena Žeželj, was also traveling in front of them at the time but was not involved in the crash. Stevan Zečević was born in 1983 and was from Novi Sad, Serbia. Zorica Lazić was also born in 1983 and was from Zemun, a city near Belgrade. Elmir Kuduzović came from the city of Tuzla in Bosnia and Herzegovina, and was born in 1981.

Zečević, Lazić and Kuduzović had been en route to making a scheduled celebrity promotional appearance at a party when they were killed. The remaining Veliki Brat housemates were informed of the deaths off-camera.

Serbian television station B92 and production company Emotion announced in a press statement issued on 29 December that they had decided to end the season early due to the tragic deaths of Zečević, Lazić and Kuduzović. The show had been previously scheduled to end its season on 5 January 2008. Zečević, Lazić and Kuduzović had been scheduled to return to the Veliki Brat house on New Year's Eve as part of the season finale.

The cancellation was reportedly the second time that Big Brother season had been cancelled anywhere in the world. The first being Big Brother: The Boss, the Arabian version of Big Brother. In 2020, two seasons of Big Brother in the world that had been cancelled mid-season were the second season of the Bigg Boss Malayalam in India and the eighth season of Big Brother Canada, where the two seasons cancelled midway in that season due to the COVID-19 pandemic in India and Canada. In 2021, the eighth season of the Kannada language version of Bigg Boss in India became the fifth season had been cancelled mid-season due to COVID-19 pandemic in India has deteriorated.  However, after a two-month break the show resumed in July 2021 with the sub-title "Second Innings," referencing a period in cricket.

Housemates 
Nine housemates entered the house on launch night. A week later on day seven, five more entered the house. On day thirty five Miroslav, who took part in the first season but decided to quit after fifteen days entered the house. Out of 22 total housemates, 17 were from Serbia, 3 from Bosnia and Herzegovina and 2 from Montenegro.

Nominations Table

Notes
Only the King, Mišel could nominate this week.
Elmir was banned from nominating as punishment for talking about politics, Mićko was banned from nominating as punishment for talking about the outside world.
Stevan was automatically nominated for threatening Big Brother, Burek was banned for political discussion and provocation, Elmir was banned for throwing fagend to Marina, Jelena and Nataša were banned for public suggestion they would nominate Tanja, Mićko was banned for discussing nominations.
Mićko was automatically nominated for violent behavior
Dijana and Jelena were automatically nominated for discussing nominations, Slaviša was automatically nominated for refusing to nominate, Mićko was banned for discussing nominations and got a punishment for the whole House - 48 hours without hot water, because of violent behavior. Two Housemates left the House this week
Surprising nominations happened on Day 35, Saturday. The 7th Housemate left the House on Day 39, Halloween
There were no regular nominations this week. Aleksandar and Miki were automatically nominated for failing to succeed in the weekly assignment. Miki chose Slaviša to be the 3rd nominee. Dijana, Marina, Nataša, Slaviša and Suzana were given the chance to return one of the evicted Housemates back to the House. They chose Stevan.
Mirko could not be nominated this week because it was his first week in the House. Miki decided to leave the House on Day 75 after he failed to convince Mirko, his father, to leave the House.
Dijana and Đorđe could not be nominated this week because they won immunity in this week's wedding task. Two Housemates returned to the House after 35-min public vote on Day 84.
There were no nominations this week and all Housemates were nominated because Danilo refused to leave the confession room. He protested since Big Brother refused to bring him his clothes. Dijana and Đorđe could have won immunity to nominations if they had completed the weekly assignment.
The nominations were public, for the first and only time in the season.

References

External links
Veliki Brat official website (Serbian)
Production website (English)
Los Angeles Times: The country's version of 'Big Brother' includes the odd Bosnian, Croat and Kosovo Serb. Probably unintentionally, it's forcing viewers to confront their social prejudices

2007 Serbian television seasons
2007